Ellel is a civil parish in Lancaster, Lancashire, England. It contains 47 listed buildings that are recorded in the National Heritage List for England. Of these, one is listed at Grade II*, the middle grade, and the others are at Grade II. The parish contains the villages of Galgate and Dolphinholme, and is otherwise rural. A high proportion of the listed buildings are country houses, smaller houses and cottages, farmhouses and farm buildings. In the 18th and 19th centuries silk spinning took place in Galgate, and two silk mills, later converted for other uses, are listed. The Lancaster Canal passes through the parish, and the junction with its Glasson Branch is also in the parish. Associated with these are listed bridges, locks, and an aqueduct. Bridges over the Rivers Wyre and Conder are also listed. Other listed buildings include a public house, churches and structures in churchyards (including a family mausoleum), a milestone, a war memorial. and boundary stones.

Key

Buildings

References

Citations

Sources

 
 
 
 
 
 
 
 
 
 
 
 
 
 
 
 
 
 
 
 
 
 
 
 
 
 
 
 
 
 
 
 
 
 
 
 
 
 
 
 
 
 
 
 
 
 
 
 
 

Lists of listed buildings in Lancashire
Buildings and structures in the City of Lancaster